A Nepal Bhasa-medium school is one that uses Nepal Bhasa as the primary medium of instruction – in particular where Nepal Bhasa is or is not the mother tongue of the students.
Initially associated with the importance of Nepal Bhasa the schools started.

Newar language